McKinley Park may refer to a place in the United States:

 McKinley Park, Alaska, a census-designated place in the Denali Borough
 McKinley Park, Chicago, Illinois, a neighborhood
 McKinley Park, Sacramento, California, a neighborhood park

See also
 Denali National Park and Preserve, known as Mount McKinley National Park from 1917 to 1980